Kévin Mouanga (born 24 July 2000) is a French professional footballer who plays as a centre-back for Annecy.

Career
Mouanga is a youth product of AS Bondy and FC Montfermeil, and moved to the youth academy of Angers at U16 level. He began his senior career with the reserves of Angers in 2017. He made his professional debut with the senior Angers squad in a 0–0 (3–2) penalty shootout loss to Guingamp on 31 October 2018, where he played the whole match. He signed a professional contract with Angers in the summer of 2020, and spent the year with the reserves. On 5 July 2021, he transferred to Annecy in the Championnat National. He helped Annecy achieve promotion to the Ligue 2 after coming 2nd in the 2021-22 Championnat National season. He debuted with Annecy in a 2–1 Ligue 2 loss to Niort on 30 July 2022.

Personal life
Born in France, Mouanga is of Congolese (Brazzaville) descent.

References

External links
 
 

2000 births
Living people
Sportspeople from Bondy
French footballers
French sportspeople of Republic of the Congo descent
Angers SCO players
FC Annecy players
Ligue 2 players
Championnat National players
Championnat National 2 players
Championnat National 3 players
Association football defenders